Lunden is a municipality in Germany.

Lunden may also refer to:

 Lunden, is one of Old English names of London
Lunden (Amt Kirchspielslandgemeinde), an Amt ("collective municipality") in Germany
Lunden, Örgryte, a district in Gothenburg, Sweden
Lunden ÖBK, a Swedish football club based in Gothenburg
Lunden Station, a train station in Norway
Lunden (surname), a surname